Erik Christensen (born 1983) is a Canadian ice hockey centre.

Erik Christensen may also refer to:

Erik Christensen (American football) (born 1931), American football defensive end
Erik Christensen (canoeist) (born 1938), Danish sprint canoer
Erik Skov Christensen (born 1958), Danish teacher, politician and former mayor

See also
Eric Christensen (disambiguation)